The House of Wiśniowiecki was a Polish princely family. The surname derives from the family estate of Wiśniowiec. Notable family members, named Wiśniowiecki (masculine) or Wiśniowiecka (feminine) included:

 Adam Wiśniowiecki (c.1566–1622), supporter of the False Dmitry
 Dymitr Jerzy Wiśniowiecki (1631–1682), castellan of Kraków
 Eleanor of Austria, Queen of Poland, also known as Eleonora Wiśniowiecka (1653–1697)
Franciszka Urszula Radziwiłłowa née Wiśniowiecka (1705-1753)
 Gryzelda Konstancja Wiśniowiecka née Zamoyska (1623–1672), wife of Jeremi Wiśniowiecki
 Janusz Wiśniowiecki (1598–1636), starosta (captain) of Krzemieniec
 Jeremi Wiśniowiecki (1612–1651), voivode (palatine) of Ruthenia
 Konstanty Wiśniowiecki (1564–1641), voivode (palatine) of Belz and Ruthenia
 Marianna Wiśniowiecka (1600–1624), wife of Jakub Sobieski
 Michał Korybut Wiśniowiecki (1640–1673), king of Poland
 Michał Serwacy Wiśniowiecki (1680–1744), voivode (palatine) of Vilnius
 Michał Wiśniowiecki (1529–1584), starosta (captain) of Czerkasy, Kaniów, Lubeka and Łojów
 Michał Wiśniowiecki (d. 1616), starosta (captain) of Owrucz
 Regina Wiśniowiecka née Movilă (1588–1619), wife of Michał Wiśniowiecki

See also 

 Vishnevetsky, similar Ukrainian surname
 Wiśniewski, similar Polish surname